= Hierion =

Byzantine-era Thracian town

Coordinates: 41°01′52″N 28°58′33″E

Hierion (Greek: Ιερίον) was a town of ancient Thrace, inhabited during Byzantine times.

Its site is located above Galata in European Turkey.
